Cheetah on Fire (released in the Philippines as Fight to Survive) is a 1992 Hong Kong martial arts film directed by Thomas Yip and starring Donnie Yen, Carrie Ng, Sharla Cheung, Gordon Lau, Ken Lo, Eddy Ko, Shing Fui-On, and Michael Woods.

Cast
Donnie Yen as Ronald
Carrie Ng as Wu Li-yung
Sharla Cheung as Peggy
Gordon Lau as Long Hair
Ken Lo as Long Hair's man
Eddy Ko as Fok Chi-kien
Shing Fui-On as Tong Yiang
Michael Woods as black thug
John Salvitti as white thug
Mark Houghton as Mak

Release
Cheetah on Fire was first released in Hong Kong in 1992. In the Philippines, the film was released as Fight to Survive on 12 November 1992.

Home media
The film was released on VHS in the United States by Tai Seng Video Marketing in 1998.

On 1 August 2000, the film was released by Universe Laser on VCD in Hong Kong; it has since gone out of print.

Critical reception
In his encyclopedic book about Hong Kong cinema, John Charles gave Cheetah on Fire five out of ten stars, stating that "this low budget effort is packed with action, which helps one to forget just how pedestrian the screenplay is."

References

External links

1992 films
1992 martial arts films
1990s Cantonese-language films
Hong Kong martial arts films
1990s Hong Kong films